The Quarters of Esch-sur-Alzette are the smallest administrative division for local government in Esch-sur-Alzette.

There are currently sixteen quarters, covering most of the commune of Esch-sur-Alzette.  They are:

 Al Esch
 Belval
 Brill
 Brouch
 Dellhéicht
 Fettmeth
 Grenz
 Lallange
 Lankelz
 Neudorf
 Parc
 Raemerich
 Sommet
 Uecht
 Wobrécken
 Zaepert

In addition, there are two former industrial zones that are outside the remit of the quarters: one in the west (Esch-Belval), and one in the east (Esch-Schifflange).

See also
 Quarters of Luxembourg City

 
Quarters (urban subdivision)